A Passage in Time is a compilation album by Australian musical act Dead Can Dance. It was originally released only in North America on 20 October 1991 by Rykodisc, and was later remastered and given a global release in 1998.

The album was titled after the song "A Passage in Time", which originally appeared on the group's eponymous debut album in 1984 but was not included in the collection.

Overview
As the title suggests, this album was "a passage in time" to enable the U.S. audience catch up with the band's previous albums, via selected songs.

The content of the compilation was predominantly taken from the band's most recent works at the time, their fourth (The Serpent's Egg) and fifth (Aion) albums. It also featured two songs from their third album (Within the Realm of a Dying Sun) and one from their second (Spleen and Ideal), but no selections from their debut or the Garden of the Arcane Delights EP. Two previously unreleased tracks were included, "Bird" and "Spirit" (both were later added to the double vinyl version of 1993's Into the Labyrinth).

Track listing

References

External links
 

Dead Can Dance albums
1991 compilation albums
Rykodisc compilation albums